Luiz Fernando Ferreira de Souza (born 11 July 1999), known as Luiz Fernando, is a Brazilian footballer who plays as a forward for Ponte Preta, on loan from Tombense.

He was included in The Guardian's "Next Generation 2016".

Career statistics

References

External links
Athletico Paranaense official profile 

1999 births
Living people
Sportspeople from Florianópolis
Brazilian footballers
Association football forwards
Campeonato Paranaense players
Tombense Futebol Clube players
Club Athletico Paranaense players
América Futebol Clube (MG) players
Associação Atlética Ponte Preta players